DNA repair protein complementing XP-G cells is a protein that in humans is encoded by the ERCC5 gene.

Function 

Excision repair cross-complementing rodent repair deficiency, complementation group 5 (xeroderma pigmentosum, complementation group G) is involved in excision repair of UV-induced DNA damage. Mutations cause Cockayne syndrome, which is characterized by severe growth defects, mental retardation, and cachexia. Multiple alternatively spliced transcript variants encoding distinct isoforms have been described, but the biological validity of all variants has not been determined.

Mutations in ERCC5 cause arthrogryposis.

XPG is a structure specific endonuclease that incises DNA at the 3’ side of the damaged nucleotide during nucleotide excision repair.

Syndromes

Mutational defects in the Ercc5(Xpg) gene can cause either the cancer-prone condition xeroderma pigmentosum (XP) alone, or in combination with the severe neurodevelopmental disorder Cockayne syndrome (CS) or the infantile lethal cerebro-oculo-facio-skeletal syndrome.

Mouse model

An Ercc5(Xpg) mutant mouse model presented features of premature aging including cachexia and osteoporosis with pronounced degenerative phenotypes in both liver and brain.  These mutant mice developed a multi-system premature aging degenerative phenotype that appears to strengthen the link between DNA damage and aging. (see DNA damage theory of aging).

Dietary restriction, which extends lifespan of wild-type mice, also substantially increased the lifespan of Ercc5(Xpg) mutant mice.  Dietary restriction of the mutant mice, while delaying aging, also appeared to slow the accumulation of genome wide DNA damage and to preserve transcriptional output, thus contributing to improved cell viability.

Interactions 

ERCC5 has been shown to interact with ERCC2.

References

External links 
 GeneReviews/NIH/NCBI/UW entry on Xeroderma Pigmentosum

Further reading

External links

Human proteins
Oncogenes